Rafael Shlaterovich Ampar (born 20 March 1964) is a politician from Abkhazia. In the Government of President Bagapsh, from 2005 until 2011, Ampar was Chairman of the State Committee for Youth Affairs and Sports. He was not re-appointed by Alexander Ankvab, Bagapsh's successor. In the 2014 Presidential election, Ampar was campaign manager for Leonid Dzapshba, who came in fourth and last place with 3.4% of the votes.

On 12 February 2016, Ampar was appointed Deputy Chairman of the State Committee for Physical Culture and Sports.

References

1964 births
Living people
Chairmen of the State Committee for Youth Policy of Abkhazia
Chairmen of the State Committee for Sports of Abkhazia